The madrasa of Tatar al-Hijaziya is located in the old Fatimid capital of al-Qahira, which became part of modern Cairo. Built during the second reign of al-Nasir Hasan, it also contained her mausoleum (qubba).

Founder

Tatar al-Hijaziya was a daughter of al-Nasir Muhammad. She was married to several prominent Mamluk amirs, although it was her husband Maliktamur al-Hijazi that she got her nisba "al-Hijaziya" from.

Inscription

A foundation inscription on the structure has survived and reads:

The foundation inscription makes clear that it was Tatar al-Hijaziya that founded the institution.

Institution

According to Al-Maqrizi, Tatar al-Hijaziya established it as a madrasa that taught the Shafiʽi school of law and Maliki school of law. One of its prestigious professors was the famous Siraj al-Din Umar b. Raslan al-Bulqini. It also served as a congregational mosque on Fridays, where a sermon (Khutbah) would be given.

See also
 List of Historic Monuments in Cairo

References